Omar Andres de Jesus Borja (born 29 February 1976) is an Ecuadorian footballer who plays club football for Barcelona Sporting Club of Guayaquil.

Club career
He started his career with Sociedad Deportiva Aucas, and went on to feature in over 280 caps for the Quito side. In 2002, he switched to rivals Club Deportivo El Nacional, the military team. It was here where he began to impress with his speed and accurate passing skills. He was for a long time considered Ecuador's best right-back, alongside Ulises de la Cruz.

In December 2007, Omar transferred, alongside seven other national players, to Barcelona SC,  .

International career
He began playing for Ecuador national team in 2006 under Colombian coach Luis Fernando Suarez. He also featured in several early 2006 friendlies in preparation for the Copa América 2007. de Jesus has currently made 5 appearances in the 2010 FIFA World Cup qualifying campaign, starting against Peru, Argentina, and Colombia. Uruguay and Venezuela

References

External links
 
 
 
 Player's FEF Card

1976 births
Living people
Footballers from Quito
Association football fullbacks
Ecuadorian footballers
Ecuador international footballers
C.D. El Nacional footballers
Barcelona S.C. footballers
S.D. Aucas footballers